The Azerbaijan International is an international badminton tournament held in Baku, Azerbaijan. The event is part of the Badminton World Federation's International Challenge and part of the Badminton Europe Elite Circuit.

Past winners

Performances by nation

References

External links
https://bwf.tournamentsoftware.com/sport/winners.aspx?id=7EC3BC45-5553-469B-B74A-00E3ADC3391D

Badminton tournaments in Azerbaijan
2019 establishments in Azerbaijan